Jennifer Chow Kit-bing, BBS, MH is a Hong Kong politician and was a member of the Wan Chai District Council for the Victoria Park constituency.

Early life
Chow grew up in North Point, Hong Kong and was married with a daughter. She runs a small furniture company with her husband in Wan Chai which later developed into a corporation. In 1988, she first contested in the District Board elections in the Eastern District Board and was elected along with Man Sai-cheong from the Hong Kong Affairs Society. She ran in the 1991 LegCo elections and was defeated by Man Sai-cheong and Martin Lee from the United Democrats of Hong Kong.

Politics
She had been a member of the Liberal Party in the eve of the 1994 District Board elections but quit in the late 1990s. She was also a member of the Urban Council of Hong Kong before it was abolished in 2000. She stood in the LegCo elections several times, including 1998 and 2000. She was one of the candidates in the 2000 Hong Kong Island by-election but was defeated by pro-democracy independent Audrey Eu.

In 2012, she joined the pro-Beijing Democratic Alliance for the Betterment and Progress of Hong Kong (DAB) on the eve of the LegCo election. She joined the DAB ticket and helped Christopher Chung Shu-kun elected to the Legislative Council.

In 2015 District Council election, her constituency was transferred into Wan Chai District Council where she was elected uncontested. She lost her seat in 2019, defeated by Gary Li.

References

1955 births
Living people
Hong Kong businesspeople
Liberal Party (Hong Kong) politicians
Economic Synergy politicians
Democratic Alliance for the Betterment and Progress of Hong Kong politicians
Members of the Election Committee of Hong Kong, 2012–2017
Members of the Election Committee of Hong Kong, 2017–2021
District councillors of Eastern District
District councillors of Wan Chai District
Members of the Urban Council of Hong Kong
Recipients of the Bronze Bauhinia Star